Cotabato's 3rd congressional district is one of the three congressional districts of the Philippines in the province of Cotabato. It has been represented in the House of Representatives since 2013. The district covers central and southern Cotabato bordering Maguindanao to the west and Lanao del Sur to the north. It consists of the municipalities of Banisilan, Carmen, Kabacan, M'lang, Matalam and Tulunan. The district contains several exclaves of the Bangsamoro autonomous region. It is currently represented in the 19th Congress by Samantha Santos of the Lakas-CMD.

Representation history

Election results

2022

2019

2016

2013

See also
Legislative districts of Cotabato

References

Congressional districts of the Philippines
Politics of Cotabato
2012 establishments in the Philippines
Congressional districts of Soccsksargen
Constituencies established in 2012